The borough of Tunbridge Wells, one of 13 local government districts in the English county of Kent, has nearly 130 current and former places of worship. The mostly rural area is dominated by the prosperous spa town of Royal Tunbridge Wells and its suburbs, such as Southborough, Pembury and Langton Green. Many of the borough's current and former churches and chapels are in the town, as are the two non-Christian places of worship. Ancient parish churches and small Nonconformist chapels characterise the villages and hamlets elsewhere in the borough, which borders East Sussex in the southwestern part of Kent. 87 places of worship are in use in the borough, serving many Christian denominations and followers of Islam and the Subud movement. A further 37 former places of worship no longer hold religious services but survive in alternative uses.

The majority of Tunbridge Wells residents identify themselves as Christian. Anglican churches serving the Church of England, the country's Established Church, are most numerous: they are found throughout the borough, in tiny villages such as Tudeley and Frittenden, Victorian suburbs such as High Brooms and Ferndale, and modern developments such as the Sherwood housing estate. Three Anglican churches are shared by other denominations, and separate chapels and meeting rooms for non-Anglican worshippers are prevalent as well. Baptists and Roman Catholics each have several places of worship; Brethren meetings take place at several locations in the borough (there are four meeting rooms in Royal Tunbridge Wells alone); and other Christian groups with places of worship in the town include Christian Scientists, the Church of Christ (with two chapels), Latter-day Saints, Quakers and The Salvation Army.

English Heritage has awarded listed status to 43 places of worship in the borough. A building is defined as "listed" when it is placed on a statutory register of buildings of "special architectural or historic interest" in accordance with the Planning (Listed Buildings and Conservation Areas) Act 1990. The Department for Culture, Media and Sport, a Government department, is responsible for this; English Heritage, a non-departmental public body, acts as an agency of the department to administer the process and advise the department on relevant issues. There are three grades of listing status. Grade I, the highest, is defined as being of "exceptional interest"; Grade II* is used for "particularly important buildings of more than special interest"; and Grade II, the lowest, is used for buildings of "special interest". As of February 2001, there were 26 Grade I-listed buildings, 128 with Grade II* status and 2,066 Grade II-listed buildings in the borough of Tunbridge Wells.

Overview of the borough and its places of worship

In 2011 the population of the borough was 115,200: just over half lived in the main towns of Royal Tunbridge Wells and Southborough, which together had an estimated population of 56,600 in 2006. Other large villages include the ancient Cranbrook, Goudhurst and Lamberhurst and the more modern Paddock Wood and Pembury. The fertile, undulating and sparsely populated Weald, from whose northern edge the North Downs rise sharply, dominates the rest of the area. Christianity reached England via Kent: in 597 Augustine was sent from Rome by Pope Gregory I to convert the population, and several 7th-century ecclesiastical buildings survive in the county. In this westernmost part of the county, though, most surviving churches date from after the Norman conquest in the late 11th century. Many parish churches date from the 12th century, "as busy a time for building [these] in Kent as for cathedral and monastic works". A typical form consists of a nave without aisles and a smaller, lower chancel, usually without an apse; examples in the borough survive in small villages such as Bidborough and Capel Churches in the larger villages such as Cranbrook, Goudhurst and Hawkhurst date from between the 13th and 15th centuries, having replaced older buildings. Large-scale churchbuilding resumed in the Victorian era, when "decadence and decay" had ruined many churches and population growth and the results of a religious census encouraged the Church of England to improve its provision of buildings for worship. Holy Trinity Church in Royal Tunbridge Wells was expensively funded and designed by prominent architect Decimus Burton at the same time as he was designing the town's most fashionable residential areas; the richly decorated Christ Church at Kilndown, a village with no church, has been "an object of national interest" since its completion in the 1840s; Holy Trinity at Sissinghurst bankrupted its builder but continues to serve its village; and new churches were provided much nearer the centres of population in villages such as Pembury and Horsmonden. Southborough's transformation into a small town and suburb of Royal Tunbridge Wells resulted in four Anglican churches being built between 1830 and 1886, including a mission chapel (now a separate parish church) at High Brooms. The single postwar Anglican church serves a new housing estate in Royal Tunbridge Wells.

Protestant Nonconformist denominations found great support in Kent, especially during the 19th century, and many of their chapels survive in the borough of Tunbridge Wells. In the similar sized neighbouring county of Sussex, 244 such chapels opened between 1818 and 1901, against 765 in Kent. Methodism was followed particularly strongly: 325 Methodist chapels (including Wesleyan, Primitive, Bible Christian and others) were built during that period, against 327 Anglican churches; Baptists and Congregationalists each gained over 150 new places of worship; and nearly 150 meeting rooms, chapels and halls for other denominations were opened. The decline of Methodism since its Victorian heyday and the amalgamation of its various strands into one denomination means that only three chapels are still in use in the borough, along with a shared Anglican and Methodist church at Paddock Wood. Former chapels, some of which closed as recently as the early 21st century, are found in many villages. Calvinism, "the characteristic religion of rural Kent", made its mark in places such as Matfield, Cranbrook, Lamberhurst and Southborough, each of which has a surviving Strict Baptist chapel. These are "typically small, neat, plain, porched and with a Hebrew name": Matfield's is called Ebenezer, as is a former chapel at Hawkhurst, and other closed chapels for Calvinistic Baptists include Providence (Cranbrook and Curtisden Green), Rehoboth (Royal Tunbridge Wells) and Jehovah Jireh (in a hamlet near Brenchley). The United Reformed Church, successor to the Congregational Church whose followers were so prevalent in the county in the 19th century, also retains three churches of its own and another shared with Anglicans. In Royal Tunbridge Wells, the vast Mount Pleasant Congregational Church (1845–48, with a huge Tuscan-columned portico and pediment of 1868) and an outlying chapel in the town's Albion Road were closed as the denomination based its worship around fewer, larger and better located churches. Plymouth and Open Brethren, served by 19 meeting rooms across Kent by 1901, have always been well provided for in the Tunbridge Wells area; three places of worship in use by World War II have been supplemented by others since the 1980s, including a large meeting hall at Five Oak Green. Brethren worshippers' "attachment to makeshift premises" and "purposeful indifference to any form of pretension" in architecture is in evidence in these modern buildings, but their oldest place of worship (the York Road Assembly of  1891) is a distinctive stuccoed Classical-style building.

Roman Catholic worship takes place in several villages as well as in Royal Tunbridge Wells itself. Most churches are postwar, but the large St Augustine's Church in Royal Tunbridge Wells (1965) succeeds a landmark building of 1837–38, built of local stone and with a campanile added later. Occupying a prominent town-centre position, it was demolished for commercial redevelopment in 1967 after the new church opened. In some places, Catholics used private houses before permanent churches were built: this happened at Cranbrook and Goudhurst, and in Pembury part of the priest's house (acquired before a church could be built) was temporarily registered as a chapel in the 1960s.

Religious affiliation
According to the United Kingdom Census 2001, 104,030 people lived in the borough of Tunbridge Wells. Of these, 75.03% identified themselves as Christian, 0.57% were Muslim, 0.26% were Buddhist, 0.19% were Hindu, 0.17% were Jewish, 0.04% were Sikh, 0.31% followed another religion, 16.02% claimed no religious affiliation and 7.41% did not state their religion. The proportion of Christians was much higher than the 71.74% in England as a whole, and the proportions of people with no religious affiliation and of followers of other religions not listed in the Census were also higher than the national averages (14.59% and 0.29% respectively). Adherents of Islam, Hinduism, Judaism and Sikhism were much less prevalent in the district than in England overall: in 2001, 3.1% of people in England were Muslim, 1.11% were Hindu, 0.67% were Sikh and 0.52% were Jewish. The proportion of Buddhists was also slightly lower than the national figure of 0.28%.

Administration

Anglican churches
Most Anglican churches in the borough are in the Archdeaconry of Tonbridge, one of three archdeaconries in the Diocese of Rochester. The seat of the diocese is Rochester Cathedral. The archdeaconry is further divided into six deaneries. The churches at Ashurst, Bidborough, Groombridge and Speldhurst are part of the Tunbridge Wells Deanery, as are all 16 in the Royal Tunbridge Wells/Southborough urban area (one each at Broadwater Down and Langton Green, two at Rusthall, four in Southborough and eight in Royal Tunbridge Wells). Those at Brenchley, Horsmonden, Lamberhurst, Matfield, Paddock Wood and Pembury are in the Paddock Wood Deanery. Tudeley and Five Oak Green churches are within the Tonbridge Deanery.

The area's other Anglican churches are administered by the Weald Deanery, part of the Archdeaconry of Maidstone which is in turn one of three archdeaconries in the Diocese of Canterbury. The churches at Benenden, Cranbrook, Frittenden, Goudhurst, Hawkhurst, Kilndown, Sandhurst (two churches) and Sissinghurst are in this deanery. The Diocese of Canterbury's seat is Canterbury Cathedral.

Roman Catholic churches
The nine Roman Catholic churches in the borough—at Benenden, Cranbrook, Goudhurst, Hawkhurst, Horsmonden, Paddock Wood, Pembury, Royal Tunbridge Wells and Southborough—are in the Archdiocese of Southwark, whose seat is St George's Cathedral in Southwark, southeast London. The archdiocese has 20 deaneries, of which seven are in Kent. The churches at Paddock Wood, Pembury, Royal Tunbridge Wells and Southborough are in the Tunbridge Wells Deanery. Those in the joint parish of Goudhurst, Hawkhurst and Horsmonden are in Maidstone Deanery, as is the church at Cranbrook and its associated Mass Centre at Benenden.

Baptist churches
About 150 Baptist churches in southeast England are part of the South Eastern Baptist Association, which arranges its member congregations into geographical networks. The churches at Hawkhurst and Sandhurst are part of the organisation's South Kent Network, while those at Pembury and Royal Tunbridge Wells (Upper Grosvenor Road) are in the Tonbridge Network—as are the Paddock Wood Baptist Church, which meets in a school rather than a building of its own, and Speldhurst Chapel, which is administratively linked to Tonbridge Baptist Church. A number of Strict and Reformed Baptist congregations also worship in chapels in the borough. Cranbrook, Lamberhurst, Matfield and Southborough each have one, and there are two in Royal Tunbridge Wells: the early 19th-century Hanover Chapel and the modern Pantiles Baptist Church. All are affiliated with the Gospel Standard movement except Southborough and the Pantiles chapel; the latter belongs to GraceNet UK, an association of Reformed Evangelical Christian churches and organisations.

Methodist churches
As of 2010, St John's Methodist Church in Southborough and Horsmonden Methodist Church were part of the Tunbridge Wells Methodist Circuit within that denomination's South East District.  Vale Royal Methodist Church in Royal Tunbridge Wells and the churches at Hawkhurst and Sandhurst, all now closed, were also part of this group.

Congregational Federation churches
Cranbrook Congregational Church and Iden Green Congregational Church are part of the Congregational Federation, an association of independent Congregational churches in Great Britain.  The federation came into existence in 1972 when the Congregational Church in England and Wales merged with several other denominations to form the United Reformed Church.  Certain congregations wanted to remain independent of this, and instead joined the Congregational Federation. As of January 2021 there were 235 churches in the Federation.

Current places of worship

Former places of worship

Notes

References

Bibliography

Tunbridge Wells
Tunbridge Wells (borough)
Tunbridge Wells (borough)
Buildings and structures in the Borough of Tunbridge Wells
Places of worship in Tunbridge Wells (borough)